Antonino is an unincorporated community in Lookout Township, Ellis County, Kansas, United States.

History
Due to the distance from their homes to St. Francis Church in Munjor, a group of the church's Volga German parishioners requested a new parish and subsequently founded Antonino in 1904. They originally wanted to name the new community St. Anthony, but the post office rejected that name for being too similar to that of Anthony, Kansas. Instead, they applied for the name "Saint Antonino" after a village in Brazil in which several residents had once lived. Due to postal regulations at that time, however, "Saint" was removed from the name. Another account claims that Antonino was named for Anthony Sauer, who was said to be the community's oldest resident.

Local residents built a new church in 1905, and a local post office opened the same year. A school house was completed in 1939, and then a new church building in 1952. The post office closed in 1984.

Geography

Education
The community is served by Hays USD 489 public school district.

Transportation
Antonino Road, a paved county road, runs east–west through the community, connecting it to U.S. Route 183 to the east.

References

Further reading

External links
 Ellis County maps: Current, Historic, KDOT

Unincorporated communities in Ellis County, Kansas
Unincorporated communities in Kansas